Stainer is a surname. Notable people with the surname include:

Greg Stainer (born 1976), British musician
Jacob Stainer (c. 1617–1683), Austrian luthier
John Stainer (1840–1901), English classical composer and organist
Pauline Stainer (born 1941), English poet

See also
Stainer & Bell, British sheet music publishing company
Stayner (disambiguation)